Thangboi Singto is an Indian football manager who is currently working as the technical director of Indian Super League club Hyderabad FC.

Coaching career

Shillong Lajong: 2013–2017
Singto joined Shillong Lajong's coaching staff back in 2009 and has been here since. However, on 22 January 2013 it was officially confirmed that Singto would become the interim head coach of the club after the sacking of Desmond Bulpin from the squad.

On 7 June 2017, after the 2016–17 season, Singto's contract was not renewed by Shillong Lajong and the two parted ways.

NorthEast United
Shillong Lajong a partner of Northeast United in the first ever ISL season, Singto was assistant manager of the Guwahati-based ISL team in 2014.

Kerala Blasters
On 25 June 2017, a few weeks after leaving Shillong Lajong, Singto signed with Indian Super League side Kerala Blasters as assistant coach and technical director of their youth development program. Thangboi was named as temporary Head Coach of Kerala Blasters following the departure of Rene Muelensteen in January 2018 until the arrival of David James.

Delhi Dynamos (Odisha FC) 
In August 2019, Singto moved to Delhi Dynamos as assistant coach under their Spanish head coach Josep Gombau. He also moved to Bhubaneswar with the club as it rebranded to Odisha FC and stayed there for a full season. During June 2020, the club announced that Thangboi Singto is no longer a part of the managerial team.

Honours

Managerial
Shillong Lajong

Shillong Premier League: 2014, 2015, 2016
Meghalaya Invitation Cup: 2016
Bodousa Cup: 2016

References

External links

Thangboi Singto profile at hyderabadfc.co.in

Living people
People from Churachandpur district
Indian football managers
I-League managers
Shillong Lajong FC managers
1974 births
Kerala Blasters FC non-playing staff